Sar Huni (also Romanized as Sar Ḩūnī; also known as Sarḩānī) is a village in Lalar and Katak Rural District, Chelo District, Andika County, Khuzestan Province, Iran. At the 2006 census, its population was 133, in 19 families.

References 

Populated places in Andika County